Pier Pressure is a Big Finish Productions audio drama based on the long-running British science fiction television series Doctor Who.

Plot
In 1936 Brighton, strange lights and terrible sounds are coming from beneath the pier, and the dead are unusually ambulatory.  The only hope is the Doctor and Evelyn and — Max Miller?

Cast
The Doctor — Colin Baker
Evelyn Smythe — Maggie Stables
Professor Talbot — Doug Bradley
Emily Bung — Sally Ann Curran
Max Miller — Roy Hudd
Billy — Martin Parsons
Albert Potter — Chris Simmons

Notes
One of the characters in this story is a young actor called Billy, who has just made a film called While Parents Sleep and also starred in I'm an Explosive. These 1930s films do exist, and contain early appearances by "Billy Hartnell", who (as William Hartnell) would later play the First Doctor.
At the beginning of the story, Evelyn suggests a trip to Blackpool, but the Doctor refuses because of what happened to him last time he visited that town. This is a reference to the unmade Sixth Doctor serial The Nightmare Fair, which was to be the first serial in season 23 – the show went on hiatus for a year instead. This story has since been made by Big Finish as a part of their Lost Stories.
The story ends with an alien energy becoming trapped in the metal structure of the West Pier, which will corrode the structure in "60 to 70 years."  This refers to the fact that the Pier suffered several collapses throughout the 1990s and 2000s (decade), eventually destroying the structure beyond repair.
The aliens in this story return in Assassin in the Limelight.
Comedian Max Miller is portrayed in this story by actor Roy Hudd, who is an authority on and biographer of the real Max Miller and president of the Max Miller Appreciation Society.
The character names Albert Potter and Emily Bung are taken from the names of characters in Carry On Screaming.

References

External links
Big Finish Productions – Pier Pressure

2006 audio plays
Sixth Doctor audio plays
Fiction set in 1936
Brighton in fiction